Memorial Avenue may refer to:

 Anzac Memorial Avenue, Australia
 Next of Kin Memorial Avenue, Canada
 King George V Memorial Avenue, Australia
 Pioneer Women's Memorial Avenue, Australia